Bertholdia fumida is a moth of the family Erebidae. It was described by Schaus in 1910. It is found in Costa Rica.

Taxonomy 
class Insecta  >  subclass Pterygota  >   infraclass Neoptera  > superorder Holometabola  >order Lepidoptera  >superfamily Noctuoidea  >  family Erebidae  > subfamily Arctiinae  >  tribe Phaegopterini   >genus Bertholdia  >  species Bertholdia fumida

Species name(s) 

 Bertholdia fumida Schaus, 1910.

References

External Links 

 http://insecta.pro/taxonomy/90118

Phaegopterina
Moths described in 1910